5-MeO-EPT is a psychedelic tryptamine derivative which has been sold as a designer drug.

Legality
5-MeO-EPT is illegal in Singapore and Japan, as well as falling within the scope of drug analogue laws in a number of other jurisdictions.

See also
 4-HO-EPT
 5-Fluoro-EPT
 5-MeO-EiPT
 5-MeO-MET
 Ethylpropyltryptamine

References 

Designer drugs
Serotonin receptor agonists
Tertiary amines
Indoles
Methoxy compounds